Events in the year 1930 in Belgium.

Incumbents

Monarch – Albert I
Prime Minister – Henri Jaspar

Events
 3 May to 3 November – Exposition internationale held in Liège with simultaneous International Exhibition of Colonies, Shipping and Flemish Art held in Antwerp.
 June – Royal visit to Mons.
 20 July – Louis Chiron wins the 1930 Belgian Grand Prix at Spa–Francorchamps.

Publications
 Album souvenir de l'exposition internationale d'Anvers 1930 (Géo M. Potié).
 Madeline Brandeis, Little Philippe of Belgium (New York, Grosset & Dunlap).

Art and architecture

 Hotel Le Plaza, Brussels opens

Births
 19 February – Alfons Verplaetse, national banker (died 2020)
 18 April – Michel Didisheim, royal secretary (died 2020)
 12 June – Herman Daled, art collector (died 2020)
 21 June – Yvette Alloo, paralympian (died 2020)
 7 September
Prince Baudouin (died 1993)
Paul-Baudouin Michel, musicologist (died 2020) 
 16 December – Jean Herbiet, theatre artistic director (died 2008)

Deaths
 11 September – Charles Lemonnier (born 1860), mayor of Brussels
 16 September – Julien Liebaert (born 1848), politician
 15 October – Albert Grisar (born 1870), sailor
 27 December – Eugène Henry (born 1862), Governor General of Congo

References

 
1930s in Belgium
Belgium
Years of the 20th century in Belgium
Belgium